This is a summary of every competitive cup entered by the Trinidad and Tobago national football team from its inception in 1905 to the present.

Competitive tournaments

All-time record against other nations
As of 17 November 2019 after match against

References

Cup